Thali (meaning "plate") or Bhojanam (meaning "full meal") is a round platter used to serve food in South Asia, Southeast Asia and the Caribbean. Thali is also used to refer to an Indian-style meal made up of a selection of various dishes which are served on a platter. Thali is also used in south Asia for ceremonial purposes.

History

Early History

According to archeologist Bindeshwari Prasad Sinha, dish-on-stand and simple dishes belonging to the Indus Valley Civilization maybe regarded as the prototype of Indian dishes as thalis but these do not have accompanying bowls commonly seen with thalis. According to Sinha the distinctive thali accompanying bowls instead appears in the Painted Grey Ware culture. Archeologist B.B. Lal similarly suggests food was eaten from the Painted Grey Ware dishes and bowls. B.B Lal notes that "typical dinner set in the Painted Grey Ware consists of the thali (dish), katora (bowl) and lota (drinking vessel)," he suggests it highlights the tradition followed today. Earliest textual sources on thali comes from Ayurveda Samhitas, Sangam and medieval period cookbooks.

A chapter in ancient Sushruta Samhita text is dedicated to dining etiquette, method of serving food and proper placement of each dish before the diner, it is the earliest known textual evidence on thali presentation.

This dining and serving etiquette from Sushruta Samhita is also adopted in medieval Indian cookbooks with some variations.

The Manasollasa texts chapter Annabhoga describes dining etiquette, method of serving food and the way in which district officers and other nobles should be treated at dinner in the court.

 

The Ksemakutuhalam culinary text advises the cook to serve boiled rice in the middle of the plate. Pulse, meat, vegetables and fish are placed (in that order) on the right, and broths, drinks, water and pickles on the left.

In Ayurvedic tradition, six tastes known as Shadrasa is used to classify foods according to their qualities for ideal meal. These six tastes include; sweet, salty, sour, pungent, bitter, astringent. Thali presentation often includes all six of these flavors.

Foreign accounts
Greek ambassador Megasthenes in his work Indica notes the dining manners of Mauryan Empire court:

Portuguese ambassador Domingo Paes who visited the court of Vijayanagar Empire notes:

Portuguese ambassador Duarte Barbosa in coastal trading town of Kozhikode in Kerala notes the way local chieftains dined:

Meera Mukherjee suggests tripod or three-footed stool may have been similar to "Mukkali" stool, a type of vernacular furniture more commonly found in southern parts of India. While Chowki, Palagai or Bajot, a four-legged stool are more commonly used with thali today.

Kansa metal
Thalis are traditionally made with Kansa metal, a mixture of copper and tin. Although it is similar to bronze, Kansa has higher tin content than bronze. The fifth chapter of the text Rasaratna Samuchaya is dedicated to Kansa with significant information about Kansa kitchenware, diningware and its benefits.

Thali/Bhojanam meal 

Thali refers to the metal plate that a thali meal may be served on, while Bhojanam refers to full meals. Thali is popular method of serving meals in South Asia. The idea behind a thali is to offer all the 6 different flavours of sweet, salt, bitter, sour, astringent and spicy on one single plate (technically the last two are actually forms of chemesthesis rather than true flavours). According to Indian food custom, a proper meal should be a perfect balance of all these six flavours. Restaurants typically offer a choice of vegetarian or meat-based thalis. Vegetarian bhojanams are very typical and commonplace in Tamil Nadu canteens

Dishes served in a thali vary from region to region in the Indian subcontinent and are usually served in small bowls, called katori in India. These katoris are placed along the edge of the round tray, the actual thali; sometimes a steel tray with multiple compartments is used. Typical dishes include rice, dal, vegetables, roti, papad, dahi (yogurt), small amounts of chutney or pickle, and a sweet dish. Rice or roti is the usual main dish that occupies the central portion of the thali, while side dishes like vegetable curries and other aforementioned delicacies are lined circularly along the round thali. Depending on the restaurant or the region, the thali consists of delicacies native to that region. In general, a thali begins with different types of breads such as puris or chapatis (rotis) and different vegetarian specialities (curries). However, in South India and Southeast Asia, rice is the only staple served with bhojanams. Thalis or Bhojanams are sometimes referred to by the regional characteristic of the dishes they contain. For example, one may encounter Andhra bhojanam, Nepalese thali, Rajasthani thali, Gujarati thali, Maharashtrian thali, Manipuri chakluk, Tamil unavu and Thai unavu. In many parts of South Asia, Southeast Asia and the Caribbean, the bread and the rice portions are not served together in the thali. Typically, the bread is offered first with rice being served afterwards, often in a separate bowl or dish.

Affordability

The Economic Survey of India 2020 has a section called Thalinomics, the survey found that the vegetarian thalis became 29% more affordable compared to 2006-07, while non-veg thalis became 18% more affordable.

See also

 Banchan
 Combination plate
 Tapas
 Indian cuisine
 Nepali cuisine
 Kamayan
 Korean table d'hôte
 Meze
 Platter (dinner)
 Honzen-ryōri
 Rice and three
 Sadya
 Kaiseki
 Zakuski

References

Further reading

 .

Indian cuisine
Pakistani cuisine
Nepalese cuisine
Malaysian cuisine
Sri Lankan cuisine
Maldivian cuisine
Afghan cuisine
Serving and dining
Gujarati cuisine
Rajasthani cuisine
Singaporean cuisine
Thai cuisine
Burmese cuisine
Bhutanese cuisine
Bangladeshi cuisine
Cambodian cuisine
Lao cuisine
Indonesian cuisine
Bruneian cuisine
Indo-Caribbean cuisine
Fijian cuisine
Mauritian cuisine
Andhra cuisine